Arnidovirineae is a suborder of viruses in the order Nidovirales. There are 4 families and 16 genera in the Arnidovirineae suborder.

Hosts 
For species that fall under the Arnidovirineae suborder, large mammals serve as natural hosts, with sizes varying from mice to boars and horses. However, for 3 genera snakes and turtles serve as natural hosts.

Genome 
Viruses in this suborder have relatively small genomes compared to other suborders in the Nidovirales order, ranging from 12-16kb. These genome differences are the primary identifying factor of the suborder. Species of Arnidovirneae have been found all around the world.

Taxonomy

Families 

 Arteriviridae
 Cremegaviridae
 Gresnaviridae
 Olifoviridae

Genera 

 Muarterivirus
 Alphaarterivirus
 Lambdaarterivirus
 Deltaarterivirus
 Epsilonarterivirus
 Etaarterivirus
 Iotaarterivirus
 Thetaarterivirus
 Zetaarterivirus
 Betaarterivirus
 Gammaarterivirus
 Nuarterivirus
 Kappaarterivirus
 Pontunivirus
 Cyclophivirus
 Kukrinivirus

Sibling suborders 

 Cornidovirineae 
 Mesnidovirineae  
 Monidovirineae
 Nanidovirineae  
 Ronidovirineae
 Tornidovirineae

References 

Nidovirales
Virus suborders